New Mexico Public Education Department (NMPED) is the New Mexico state agency that oversees public schools. The agency is headquartered in the Jerry Apodaca Education Building in Santa Fe.

The Public Education Department was founded by the New Mexico Legislature as the Territorial Board of Education and Territorial Superintendent of Schools. In 1912, the State Board of Education and State Superintendent of Public Instruction were established.

References

External links
 New Mexico Public Education Department
 PED Secretary Kurt Steinhaus

Public Education Department
Public Education Department
State departments of education of the United States